Huernia hallii is a species of plant in the family Apocynaceae. It is endemic to Namibia.  Its natural habitat is rocky areas.

References

Endemic flora of Namibia
hallii
Least concern plants
Taxonomy articles created by Polbot